Toby Greene (born 25 September 1993) is a professional Australian rules footballer and the captain of the Greater Western Sydney Giants in the Australian Football League (AFL). He was recruited by the Greater Western Sydney Giants with the 11th overall selection in the 2011 national draft.

In 2016, he was selected in the All-Australian team as the half-forward flank; in the same year, he won the Kevin Sheedy Medal as the club's best and fairest.

Greene was named co-captain of the Giants ahead of the 2022 AFL season, before assuming solo captaincy in 2023.

AFL career
Greene attended Wesley College in Glen Waverley, Victoria.

Greene played in the Greater Western Sydney's first season in 2012, debuting in round one against . A prolific ball-winner, he won the Giants' best first year player award in 2012 and was the runner-up in the Kevin Sheedy Medal as the club's best and fairest. He was nominated for the AFL Rising Star in 2012 award but was ineligible to win it due to being found guilty for a bumping offence earlier in the season.

In 2017, Greene won the Giants' leading goalkicker award with 45 goals for the season. He came equal first with fellow teammates Jonathan Patton and Jeremy Cameron.

On 17 September 2019, Greene had his one-match suspension upheld by the AFL Tribunal for making contact with the eyes of Lachie Neale, making Greene unavailable for Greater Western Sydney's Preliminary Final match against Collingwood.

Greene was able to continue with good form in the 2020 AFL season and enhanced his reputation as a match-winner. Greene was critical in the Giants' wins over eventual grand finalists Geelong and Richmond with four- and five-goal hauls, respectively, in victories. The dynamic forward missed four games due to knee and hamstring issues, but he still polled 12 Brownlow Medal votes—comfortably the most at the club.

In the 2022 AFL season Toby Greene came back from his suspension with 37 goals for the season., with a season high of 7 goals in round 14 against the Western Bulldogs.

Discipline
During Greene's playing career, he has received a total of 22 AFL Tribunal charges or Match Review Panel citations, six suspensions, and nearly $30,000 in fines. He had previously stated in 2017 that he has been unable to contain his rage in certain situations, gaining a reputation for being one of the dirtiest players in the AFL.

During a one-point victory in the Second Elimination Final of 2021, Greene was reported for making intentional contact with umpire Matt Stevic and was subsequently suspended for three weeks. With the Giants deciding not to appeal the suspension, the suspension ruled Greene out of the remainder of the 2021 AFL finals series. Nevertheless, former umpire Shane McInerney—who retired in 2019 after umpiring a record 500 games, including 26 finals—believes Greene was "lucky" to get away with a three-match suspension. On 1 September 2021, AFL CEO Gillon McLachlan said he was considering appealing Toby Greene's three-match ban in an attempt to suspend Greene for more matches, saying he found the tribunal decision "perplexing". On 7 October 2021 the AFL Appeals Board increased the penalty to a six-game suspension.

Assault charge
On 13 May 2014, Greene was charged with a number of offences, including assault with a dangerous weapon and intentionally causing serious injury, over an alleged assault at a Melbourne licensed venue the previous night. He faced court on 9 December 2014 on a charge of unlawful assault and was fined $2,500 but escaped conviction.

Statistics
 Statistics are correct to the end of the 2022 season

|- style="background:#eaeaea;"
! scope="row" style="text-align:center" | 2012
|style="text-align:center;" style="white-space: nowrap;||| 35
| 19 || 8 || 10 || 273 || 266 || 539 || 73 || 63 || 0.4 || 0.5 || 14.4 || 14.0 || 28.4 || 3.8 || 3.3 || 4
|-
| scope=row | 2013 ||  || 4
| 19 || 4 || 5 || 226 || 208 || 434 || 69 || 42 || 0.2 || 0.3 || 11.9 || 11.0 || 22.8 || 3.6 || 2.2 || 0
|- style=background:#EAEAEA
| scope=row | 2014 ||  || 4
| 15 || 7 || 2 || 197 || 225 || 422 || 81 || 62 || 0.5 || 0.1 || 13.1 || 15.0 || 28.1 || 5.4 || 4.1 || 3
|-
| scope=row | 2015 ||  || 4
| 22 || 15 || 12 || 239 || 263 || 502 || 107 || 69 || 0.7 || 0.6 || 10.9 || 12.0 || 22.8 || 4.9 || 3.1 || 3
|- style=background:#EAEAEA
| scope=row | 2016 ||  || 4
| 23 || 44 || 27 || 285 || 204 || 489 || 112 || 84 || 1.9 || 1.2 || 12.4 || 8.9 || 21.3 || 4.9 || 3.7 || 6
|-
| scope=row | 2017 ||  || 4
| 19 || 45 || 28 || 227 || 119 || 346 || 110 || 53|| 2.4 || 1.5 || 12.0 || 6.3 || 18.2 || 5.8 || 2.8 || 8
|- style=background:#EAEAEA
| scope=row | 2018 ||  || 4
| 9 || 16 || 10 || 96 || 46 || 142 || 42 || 8 || 1.8 || 1.1 || 10.7 || 5.1 || 15.8 || 4.7 || 0.9 || 1
|-
| scope=row | 2019 ||  || 4
| 19 || 27 || 14 || 283 || 161 || 444 || 104 || 64 || 1.4 || 0.7 || 14.9 || 8.5 || 23.4 || 5.5 || 3.4 || 6
|- 
| scope=row | 2020 ||  || 4
| 13 || 17 || 11 || 122 || 84 || 206 || 52 || 19 || 1.3 || 0.9 || 9.4 || 6.5 || 15.9 || 4.0 || 1.5 || 12
|-
| scope=row | 2021 ||  || 4
| 18 || 45 || bgcolor=CAE1FF | 41† || 232 || 77 || 309 || 78 || 39 || 2.5 || bgcolor=CAE1FF | 2.3† || 12.9 || 4.3 || 17.2 || 4.3 || 2.2 || 6
|-
| scope=row | 2022 ||  || 4
| 15 || 37 || 19 || 160 || 55 || 215 || 78 || 22 || 2.5 || 1.3 || 10.7 || 3.7 || 14.3 || 5.2 || 1.5 || 3
|-}
|- class=sortbottom
! colspan=3 | Career
! 191 !! 265 !! 179 !! 2340 !! 1708 !! 4048 !! 906 !! 525 !! 1.39 !! 0.94!! 12.25 !! 8.94 !! 21.19 !! 4.74 !! 2.75 !! 52
|}

Notes

Honours and achievements
 All-Australian team: 2016 2021
 2012 AFL Rising Star: nominee
 Kevin Sheedy Medal: 2016
 GWS leading Goalkicker: 2017
 Inaugural Greater Western Sydney Giants Team.
 Greater Western Sydney Giants Rising Star: 2012
 Greater Western Sydney Giants Members Choice Award: 2012
 Greater Western Sydney Giants Leading Disposal Getter: 2012 
 Greater Western Sydney Giants Mark of the Year: 2017
 Greater Western Sydney Giants Life Member

References

External links

1993 births
Living people
Greater Western Sydney Giants players
Australian rules footballers from Victoria (Australia)
Oakleigh Chargers players
People educated at Wesley College (Victoria)
All-Australians (AFL)
Kevin Sheedy Medal winners